Albula nemoptera, also known as the Caribbean bonefish, threadfin bonefish, or shafted bonefish, is a species of marine fish found in the western Caribbean Sea, from Honduras west to Panama.

Taxonomy 
This is one of two species of bonefish that was largely accepted by taxonomic authorities prior to the revision of the genus, the other being A. vulpes. Previously, bonefish populations on the eastern Pacific coast from Mexico east to Panama were also included in A. nemoptera, but have since been split into a distinct species, A. pacifica.

References 

Albuliformes
Fish of the Caribbean
Taxa named by Henry Weed Fowler
Fish described in 1911